In theology or the history of religion, heresiology is the study of heresy, and heresiographies are writings about the topic. Heresiographical works were common in both medieval Christianity and Islam.

Heresiology developed as a part of the emerging orthodoxy in the Christian state church of the Roman Empire. Church scholars studied and documented the teachings of various Christian sects in order to clearly distinguish between those they accepted as orthodox and those they rejected as heretical. Other Christian communions developed their own competing heresiological traditions as well.

In Islam, heresiology surveyed both the various Muslim sects, and also other religions such as Christianity and Judaism. Some, like Abu Mansur al-Baghdadi and Ibn Hazm wrote polemical works, arguing the falseness of sects and religions other than their own. Others, like al-Shahrastani's Al-Milal wa al-Nihal, took a more impartial approach closer to modern religious studies works.

See also
Doxography – similar outlines of philosophies

References

Bibliography
 

Heresy
Christian terminology
Theology